Cary Adgate (born August 21, 1953, in Lansing, Michigan) is a former United States Ski Team member from Boyne Falls, Michigan. He is a two time Olympian, six time national champion, and national pro champion. Adgate was recently inducted into the U.S. National Ski and Snowboard Hall of Fame.

References

Living people
American male alpine skiers
Olympic alpine skiers of the United States
Alpine skiers at the 1976 Winter Olympics
Alpine skiers at the 1980 Winter Olympics
1953 births
Sportspeople from Lansing, Michigan
20th-century American people